The 2015 1. deild was the seventy-second season of second-tier football on the Faroe Islands.

Brian Jakobsen scored 32 goals, breaking the goalscoring record in a single season, which would be then broken next year by Leif Niclasen.

League table

Top goalscorers

See also
2015 Faroe Islands Premier League
2015 Faroe Islands Cup

References

1. deild seasons
2015 in Faroe Islands football
1. deild
Faroe
Faroe